Grand Touring Endurance, shortened to GTE, is a set of regulations maintained by the Automobile Club de l'Ouest (ACO) and IMSA for grand tourer racing cars used in the 24 Hours of Le Mans, 24 hours of Daytona GTLM, and its associated series. The class was formerly known as simply Group GT (Group N-GT in the FIA GT Championship) between 1999 and 2004, and later referred to as Group GT2 between 2005 and 2011. The GT2 name has since been revived for a different set of regulations.

History 
The class, derived from the former 'GT3' class in 1998, debuted in 1999 under the name of 'GT' in 24 Hours of Le Mans, American Le Mans Series and European Le Mans Series, and as 'N-GT' in the FIA GT Championship. In 2005, the class was renamed GT2, below the faster GT1 class (formerly known as GT).
Originally, it was dominated by the Porsche 911 GT3 in its R, RS and RSR versions, but the Ferrari 360 Modena, Ferrari F430 and Panoz Esperante were also successful, as well as the BMW M3 in the United States. Other models entered were the Aston Martin V8 Vantage, Morgan Aero 8, Spyker C8 and TVR Tuscan.

After the GT1 class was dropped from ACO competitions for the 2011 season, the GT2 class was renamed as LM GTE in Europe and as GT in the United States. The new main rivals for the Porsche 911 were the Ferrari 458 Italia, Aston Martin V8 Vantage, Chevrolet Corvette, BMW M3, BMW Z4 (E89) and SRT Viper. Other less successful models in the early 2010s were the Jaguar XKR, Lamborghini Gallardo, Lotus Evora and Ford GT.

In 2015, the two dominating cars were the Porsche 911 RSR and the Ferrari 458 Italia GT2 (by points achieved).

In the 2018/19 season, the most competitive LM GTE cars are the Porsche 911 RSR, the Ferrari 488 GTE Evo and the Ford GT (by points achieved).

In 2021, IMSA announced that the GTLM class would be replaced with a GT3 based GTD pro class. The ACO also announced that GTE in the WEC would also be replaced by GT3 in 2024, with the GTE Pro class seeing its final race in 2022 and the GTE Am in 2023.

Regulations 

The ACO has defined limits and requirements for the LM GTE category to ensure that cars are legitimately production-based. The car must have "an aptitude for sport with 2 doors, 2 or 2+2 seats, opened or closed, which can be used perfectly legally on the open road and available for sale." The ACO modifies its regulations for “small manufacturers” (less than 2000 cars produced a year). In order to be eligible, a big manufacturer must produce at least one car a week or a small manufacturer one car a month. The cars will be eligible to race when 100 road cars for big manufacturers or 25 road cars for small manufacturers are produced. The car must have an official launch campaign and sales network. The engine must be used in a production car; while this is usually the engine from the road car, the ACO has made exceptions for cars like the BMW Z4 GTE which use engines from other models. Carbon fiber, titanium and magnesium are banned except for special parts like spoilers or wheels. Cars with carbon cockpits (that are not directly attached to the suspension) are allowed. The engine displacement is limited to 5.5L naturally aspirated or 4.0L turbo/supercharged. The SRT Viper is granted a special waiver to 8.0L. The minimum weight is 1,245 kg including driver, fuel, helmet and liquids. Cars must have working lights and windshield wipers at all times. To distinguish from faster Le Mans Prototypes at night, LM GTE cars must use yellow headlights (not in WEC). Four-wheel drive is banned while engine-based traction control is allowed. Gearboxes are limited to six forward gears. All cars must also have rear-view cameras in addition to side mirrors.

Cars are allowed one set of modifications every two years. Brand new cars are allowed one extra set of modifications in the first year of competition. Small aerodynamic modifications are allowed for Le Mans each year. If the road car is upgraded with a new part, that part can also be used on the LM GTE car through updating the homologation. Manufacturers can also apply for waivers to allow the homologation of cars or parts that would normally be banned by the rules.

Overall, the technical regulations are focused on keeping LM GTE cars relatively close to road cars in terms of parts and dimensions. Aerodynamic devices such as spoilers are heavily regulated. There are also minor requirements that are holdovers from the earlier era of Le Mans, such as requiring at least 150 cubic decimetres of luggage space.

At Le Mans, LM GTE is divided into two classes: GTE-Pro and GTE-Am. GTE-Am cars must be at least one year old or be built to the previous year's spec, and have limits on the qualification of drivers allowed in the lineup.

The Endurance Committee of the ACO has the absolute right to modify the Balance of Performance between LM GTE cars through adjusting the weight, engine or aerodynamics. Air restrictors are used with default values for specific engine capacities.

2016 updates 
At the 2015 24 Hours of Le Mans, the ACO announced a range of changes for the LM GTE class for the 2016 season. The aim of the changes is to increase the performance of the cars relative to the GT3-spec machinery that they compete against in certain series, whilst reducing cost and improving the safety of the cars. The regulations will be less restrictive, and so there will be a reduced reliance on waivers to allow certain cars to compete. One example of this is the increased freedom of aerodynamic development within specific regions of the car. The new cars will be able to compete in LM GTE Pro from 2016 alongside the 'old' specification of car, before becoming available for LM GTE Am in 2017. In 2018, the 'old' specification of car will be out of competition.

Replacement of GTE Regulations 
Autosport magazine reported that on 20 August 2021 that the ACO had announced that they will be dropping the GTE class in favour of GT3 cars from the 2024 season onwards. "The current GTE Pro and GTE Am classes will remain in place for the 2022 and 2023 WEC seasons, including Le Mans, following the decline of GTE racing with only four cars in the WEC Championship and three in the IMSA WeatherTech SportsCar Championship in 2021."

List of LM GTE cars

Series which use LM GTE cars 
 The FIA World Endurance Championship (including the 24 Hours of Le Mans) use LM GTE cars in the LM GTE Pro and LM GTE Am categories
 The European Le Mans Series has a dedicated class for LM GTE cars.

See also 
Group GT3
Automobile Club de l'Ouest

References

External links 
 LM GTE regulations as of March 8, 2013 

Sports car racing
Racing car classes
Grand tourers